The Italian Ambassador to Albania is the Ambassador of the Italian government to the government of Albania.

<onlyinclude>

References

Albania
 
Italy